Perceval is a public sculpture by British artist Sarah Lucas, a member of the Young British Artists movement. It is located in Aspire Park, Doha, Qatar. Perceval is the only piece of public art made by Sarah Lucas.

References

Sculptures in Qatar
Doha
Statues in Qatar